Oligoaeschna is a genus of dragonfly in the family Aeshnidae. It contains the following species:
Oligoaeschna amata 
Oligoaeschna amani 
Oligoaeschna aquilonaris 
Oligoaeschna buehri 
Oligoaeschna elacatura 
Oligoaeschna foliacea 
Oligoaeschna modiglianii 
Oligoaeschna mutata 
Oligoaeschna petalura 
Oligoaeschna platyura 
Oligoaeschna poeciloptera 
Oligoaeschna pseudosumatrana 
Oligoaeschna sumatrana 
Oligoaeschna uemurai 
Oligoaeschna uropetala 
Oligoaeschna venatrix 
Oligoaeschna venusta 
Oligoaeschna zambo

References

Aeshnidae
Taxa named by Edmond de Sélys Longchamps
Anisoptera genera
Taxonomy articles created by Polbot